Duch is a surname. Notable people with the surname include:

Bolesław Bronisław Duch (1885–1980), Polish general
Jaume Duch Guillot (born 1962), spokesperson of the European Parliament
Jordi Salvador i Duch (born 1964), Catalan politician
Rhys Duch (born  1986), Canadian lacrosse player
Sophea Duch, Cambodian singer

See also
 
 Duch (TV series), a 2022 Czech action crime comedy television series
Kang Kek Iew, nom de guerre Comrade Duch or Deuch (1942–2020), a war criminal and former leader in the Khmer Rouge
Duch., the standard author abbreviation used to indicate Pierre Étienne Simon Duchartre as the author when citing a botanical name
The Duch, David Duchovny

Catalan-language surnames
Czech-language surnames
Polish-language surnames